François Reichenbach (3 July 1921 – 2 February 1993) was a French film director, cinematographer producer and screenwriter. He directed 40 films between 1954 and 1993.

Early life 
François Reichenbach was born in 1921 in Neuilly-sur-Seine into an extremely wealthy family of industrialists and businessmen. His father Bernard was a successful businessman and his mother Germaine had a passion for music, which she passed on to young François.

His maternal grandfather Gaston Monteux was a wealthy industrialist: he was one of the first to buy paintings by Chagall, Braque, Picasso, Soutine, Utrillo and Modigliani. In his memoirs François Reichenbach says: "At the age of five I was terrified by all the faces in the paintings. And I became a forger. I added mustaches and hairs to the nudes of Modigliani. This hoax takes on another dimension when you know that I made a film with Orson Welles about the forger Elmyr de Hory in 1973.

He is the nephew of the manuscript and book collector Jacques Guérin and the cousin of the film producer Pierre Braunberger, who encouraged him to make films.

Emigration 
During the Second World War, François Reichenbach went to Geneva. Although he was born in France, he also has Swiss nationality because his paternal grandfather, Arnold Reichenbach, is a rich Swiss industrialist working in the embroidery industry in St. Gallen. He studied music at the Geneva Conservatory of Music, where he met the film director Gérard Oury.

After the Liberation, he wrote songs, notably for Édith Piaf and Marie Dubas.

Then, remembering the huge collection of paintings of his childhood, he left for the United States with an emigrant card to sell paintings. He started in New York as an advisor to American museums for the purchase of works of art in Europe, then he sold master paintings. He spent several years in the United States.

Death 
On his deathbed, François Reichenbach confided to Daniele Thompson his wish to be buried in Limoges where he had spent his vacations in his youth. Faced with the protests of the screenwriter, arguing that it would be inconvenient to visit him, the filmmaker replied "Those who love me will take the train "

This quote inspired Danièle Thompson to write the title of the film Ceux qui m'aiment prendront le train (Those who love me will take the train) by Patrice Chéreau, starring Jean-Louis Trintignant, Charles Berling and Vincent Perez. François Reichenbach died on February 2, 1993, in Neuilly-sur-Seine. He is buried in the Louyat cemetery in Limoges.

Work as a director 
This pioneer of the New Wave through the importance of his cinematographic work makes this man, with a free and respectful look at others, a privileged witness of his time. He always has a camera loaded on the back seat of his car to film immediately just in case, because he likes to "film everything that moves ". The magazine Cahiers du cinéma wrote: "François Reichenbach was born with a camera in his eye ".

In 1955, he bought his first 16mm Bell & Howell camera and made his fourth short film Impressions de New York, which won the Special Jury Prize at the Tours Film Festival and a mention at the Edinburgh International Film Festival: his career as a filmmaker was launched. François Reichenbach films everything that comes into his head, with both eyes open. He says that "cinema is made by one-eyed people: one eye in the viewfinder, the other closed to better concentrate on the image. He keeps the other one open (the human eye) so as not to lose contact and not to abandon the filmed subject to the machine that is the camera.

In 1957, he directed his first short film, The Marines, about an elite American unit, which imposed a new style through the impression of truth, the nerve and the originality of the gaze.

The filmmaker François Reichenbach with Zino Davidoff in Geneva (1984)

This bulimic of images films tirelessly what he observes according to his inspiration and his wanderings. Above all, he likes to present himself as a musician. He has made more than a hundred documentaries, alternating between France, the United States and Mexico, with a very personal filmography and artistic reports close to journalism. He has made a wide variety of portraits, including the film-maker Orson Welles, musicians Yehudi Menuhin, Arthur Rubinstein, Mstislav Rostropovitch, Manitas de Plata, popular artists such as Johnny Hallyday, Sylvie Vartan, Barbara, Mireille Mathieu, Diane Dufresne, Vince Taylor, soccer players Pelé and Pascal Olmeta, the matador El Cordobés, the sculptor Arman, the guitarist Manitas de Plata, the painter Marguerite Dunoyer de Segonzac, the cigar merchant Zino Davidoff, the conductor Herbert von Karajan, and the actresses Jeanne Moreau and Brigitte Bardot.

François Reichenbach is also the author of the scopitone (the ancestor of the video clip) of Bonnie and Clyde (1967) sung by Serge Gainsbourg and Brigitte Bardot.

In 1960, his first feature film, Unusual America, caused a sensation with its new style, its impression of truth and the originality of its vision. It filmed the American citizen from his birth to his death in all the comical, burlesque and unusual circumstances of his life.

In 1964, he received the Palme d'Or at the Cannes Film Festival for his short film La Douceur du village. It shows with simplicity and poetry the life of a country schoolboy in the village of Loué. Then, François Reichenbach received the Oscar for best documentary film in 1970 for L'Amour de la vie - Artur Rubinstein.

At the end of his life he returned to Geneva, the city of his musical studies, to make four films: The Art of Cigar Smoking by Zino Davidoff (1983), Geneva (1988), Nestlé by Reichenbach (1990) and Swiss Faces for the 700th anniversary of the Swiss Confederation (1991).

Selected filmography
 Male nudes (1954)
 America As Seen by a Frenchman (1960)
 Arthur Rubinstein – The Love of Life (1969)
 F for Fake (1975)
 Do You Hear the Dogs Barking? (1975)

References

External links

1921 births
1993 deaths
French cinematographers
French film directors
French male screenwriters
20th-century French screenwriters
20th-century French male writers